The 2013 NBA Development League Draft was the 13th draft of the National Basketball Association Development League (NBDL). The draft was held on November 1, 2013, just before the 2013–14 season.

Key

Draft

First round

Second round

Third round

Fourth round

Fifth round

Sixth round

Seventh round

Eighth round

References

Draft
NBA G League draft
National Basketball Association lists
NBA Development League draft